Zhang Wenkang(born 1940 in Nanhui, Shanghai) was the health minister of China during the SARS outbreak who was sacked for mishandling the matter.

Zhang was a supporter of Jiang Zemin, former General Secretary of the Chinese Communist Party. After he was fired, he was placed in various ceremonial positions.

References

1940 births
Living people
People's Republic of China politicians from Shanghai